Shafter is an unincorporated community in northwest Linn County, in the central region of the U.S. state of Missouri. It was named after General William Rufus Shafter, a Union Army general during the American Civil War.  The town has a population of approximately 500 residents. The community is on Missouri Route DD one mile east of Missouri Route 139. Parson Creek flows past the west side of the community.

History
Shafter was established in the late 19th century and was primarily a farming community. It is located on the Missouri River and is situationed near the Mark Twain National Forest. A post office called Shafter was established in 1898, and remained in operation until 1906.

Landmarks 
The town has several historic buildings anjd landmarks, including the Shafter Unoin Church and the Shafter Schoolhouse. The Shafter Union Church, built in 1868, is a registered historic site and is listed on the National Register of Historic Places.

Events 
Shafter hosts several events throughout the year, including the annual Shafter Homecoming Celebration and the Shafter Community Picnic.

References 

Unincorporated communities in Linn County, Missouri
Unincorporated communities in Missouri